Valerie "Val" Lloyd (born 16 November 1943) is a Welsh Labour politician. She represented the constituency of Swansea East at the National Assembly for Wales from 2001 to 2011.

Education
Born in the Townhill area of Swansea, Glamorgan, Lloyd was educated at Swansea High School for Girls and at the Swansea University.

Professional career
Lloyd has had a career as a nurse working in the primary and secondary health care sectors in Swansea, London and Zambia, and then later as a teacher, which took her to places such as Bahrain. Before joining the National Assembly for Wales, Lloyd worked as a senior lecturer in nursing at the School of Health Science in Swansea University.

Political career

Previously a councillor representing the Morriston Ward in the City and County of Swansea, Lloyd was elected to theNational Assembly for Wales to represent the constituency of Swansea East in the Assembly's first by-election on 27 September 2001.

In the National Assembly, Lloyd chaired the Assembly Member Labour Party Group and Legislation Two Committee. She was also a member of the Legislation One Committee and a member of the Health, Wellbeing and Local Government Committee. Lloyd chaired the All Party Group on Waterways and the All Party Group on Nursing.

External links
Val Lloyd AM Website
Welsh Labour Party Website
Website of the Welsh Assembly Government

1943 births
Living people
Councillors in Wales
Wales AMs 1999–2003
Wales AMs 2003–2007
Wales AMs 2007–2011
Politicians from Swansea
Welsh Labour members of the Senedd
Female members of the Senedd
Alumni of Swansea University
20th-century British women politicians
Women councillors in Wales